Horsham District Council in West Sussex, England, is elected every four years.

Political control
The first elections to the council were held in 1973, initially acting as a shadow authority before coming into its full powers on 1 April 1974. Political control of the council since 1973 has been held by the following parties:

Leadership
The leaders of the council since 2001 have been:

Council elections
1973 Horsham District Council election
1976 Horsham District Council election
1979 Horsham District Council election (New ward boundaries)
1983 Horsham District Council election (District boundary changes took place but the number of seats remained the same)
1987 Horsham District Council election (District boundary changes took place but the number of seats remained the same)
1991 Horsham District Council election
1995 Horsham District Council election (District boundary changes took place but the number of seats remained the same)
1999 Horsham District Council election
2003 Horsham District Council election (New ward boundaries)
2007 Horsham District Council election
2011 Horsham District Council election
2015 Horsham District Council election (Some new ward boundaries)
2019 Horsham District Council election (New ward boundaries)
2023 Horsham District Council election

References

External links
Horsham District Council

 
Council elections in West Sussex
Horsham District
District council elections in England